Isaac George Hawthorne (12 November 1912 – December 1992) was a Unionist politician in Northern Ireland.

Hawthorne was schooled in Portadown and Sheffield before becoming a farmer.  He was elected to Armagh County Council in 1947 as an Ulster Unionist Party member, holding his seat until 1958.  In 1955, he was elected to the Parliament of Northern Ireland in a by-election in Central Armagh.

From 1959 to 1963, Hawthorne served as Ulster Unionist Chief Whip, a position which was accompanied by the title Parliamentary Secretary to the Ministry of Finance.  From 1965, he served as an Assistant Whip then, in 1966, he became Parliamentary Secretary to the Ministry of Development.  In September 1967, he was convicted of drink driving and resigned his post.  He was unable to secure reselection by his constituency party for the 1969 Northern Ireland general election, and decided to stand down from Parliament.

Notes

 

1912 births
1992 deaths
Farmers from Northern Ireland
Members of Armagh County Council
Members of the House of Commons of Northern Ireland 1953–1958
Members of the House of Commons of Northern Ireland 1958–1962
Members of the House of Commons of Northern Ireland 1962–1965
Members of the House of Commons of Northern Ireland 1965–1969
Northern Ireland junior government ministers (Parliament of Northern Ireland)
Ulster Unionist Party members of the House of Commons of Northern Ireland
Members of the House of Commons of Northern Ireland for County Armagh constituencies
Ulster Unionist Party councillors